The Monarch Wilderness (also Monarch Wilderness Complex) is a federally designated wilderness area located 70  miles east of Fresno, California, in the Sierra Nevada mountain range. It encompasses  within both the Sequoia National Forest and the Sierra National Forest and is managed by the United States Forest Service.

History
Formerly known as the High Sierra Primitive Area,  the California Wilderness Act of 1984 created the Monarch Wilderness and became part of the National Wilderness Preservation System.

The Monarch Wilderness offers over 30 miles of trails with sweeping views of Kings Canyon and some classic high Sierra backcountry, as well as descents into the canyon itself. With dramatic elevation changes the vegetation ranges from chaparral and sub-alpine to alpine - covering about every species of tree known in this part of the Sierra, and then transforming into pure granite above the treeline. The remote Monarch Wilderness offers the chance to walk alone among  Giant Sequoias and hike up to the isolated and wild Grizzly Lakes area. Above Upper Grizzly Lake you can scramble up the granite and access the spectacular Monarch Divide.

Within the Sequoia National Forest section of the Monarch there is only one main lake, Grizzly Lake, which offers beautiful views, access to the sublime heights of the Monarch Divide and a much more remote camping experience. The Boulder Creek drainage cuts through parts of the southern section of the Monarch and is the main water source in that area. But many creeks in the Monarch often run dry in the hot summer months. There are three trailheads that offer entry into the wilderness: Deer Cove, Kennedy Meadow and Deer Meadow.
NOTE: Parts of this wilderness area were heavily affected by the 2015 Rough Fire and have only recently been reopened to the public, while others remain closed.

Adjacent to the wilderness are several roadless areas:  Kings Range Special Management Area (SMA), Agnew Roadless Area and the Oat Mountain Roadless Area.

The larger northern half has the South and Middle Forks of the Kings River. Major tributaries in the north unit are Tombstone Creek and Silver Creek.

The south unit was formerly a part of the Agnew Roadless Area and contains groves of  giant sequoia including the Agnew Grove which is one of the few groves in the Sierra outside the boundaries of the Sequoia-Kings Canyon Wilderness.

Native species of rare plants include Congdon's lewisia (Lewisia congdonii), state-listed as rare in 1982  and the Tehipite Valley jewelflower (Streptanthus fenestratus). Also the woollyhead lessingia (Lessingia hololeuca) and Hall's daisy (Erigeron aequifolius), both of the Aster family.

Kings River Special Management Area 
The United States Congress established the Kings River Special Management Area (SMA) in 1987 (Pub. L. 100–150) to "provide for public outdoor recreation use and enjoyment...to protect those areas' natural, archaeological, and scenic resources, and to provide for appropriate fish and wildlife management...". The SMA is managed by the Sierra National Forest which can limit certain uses of the area, such as timber cutting, hunting and fishing.  There is no mining allowed within the SMA.  A management plan is required that includes a provision for "management of vegetation within the area designed to enhance the wildlife carrying capacity of the area." The law does not change existing off-road vehicle management rules, but does require the establishment of a trail into Little Tehipite Valley.

The special management area is located at the confluence of the Kings River and the North Fork, and protects the deepest part of the Kings Canyon as well as stands of giant sequoia (the Cabin Creek and Converse Mountain Groves), the world's largest trees,  and important wintering ranges for the Monarch and Hume deer herds. The SMA provides habitat for deer, black bear, coyote, marten, gray fox and a variety of birds. Bats are common in the limestone caves in the southeast portion of the SMA.

Recreation and access 
Day hiking, backpacking, nature photography and whitewater rafting are some of the activities in the wilderness. The north unit requires permits for overnight use. The main trail in this area is the 9-mile Deer Cove Trail which provides access to the Monarch Divide.

The south unit of the wilderness in Sequoia National Forest does not require permits and has three trailheads and three main trails into the wilderness.
The SMA unit contains numerous waterfalls and pools of the Kings Canyon. The three-mile-long (5 km) Kings River National Recreation Trail provides access up-canyon along the river.

Notes

References 
Adkinson, Ron. Wild Northern California. The Globe Pequot Press, 2001

External links 
 Hume Lake Ranger District Wilderness: unofficial website
  Sierra National Forest: official website.
  Sequoia National Forest and Monument: official website.
 Wilderness.net page on Monarch Wilderness.
 Cornell Law Library, Kings River SMA text of law.
 Photo of Upper Kings River and whitewater rafter.

Sierra National Forest
Protected areas of the Sierra Nevada (United States)
Protected areas of Fresno County, California
Wilderness areas of California
Sequoia National Forest